Kristy Frilling Skelly (born January 8, 1990) is an American former professional tennis player.

A left-handed player from Sidney, Ohio, Frilling was a junior doubles semifinalist at the 2007 US Open. Frilling, who is of Korean descent on her mother's side, was a five-time All-American in varsity tennis at Notre Dame University, amassing 235 combined wins. She graduated from Notre Dame in 2012 and then spent a year and a half competing on the professional tour.

Frilling won five doubles titles on the ITF Women's Circuit, including a $50,000 tournament at Indian Harbour Beach. In her only WTA Tour main-draw appearance, at Cincinnati in 2008, she and partner Madison Brengle won their way through to the semifinals of the doubles. She retired with a career-high singles ranking of 679 and best doubles ranking of 230 in the world.

ITF finals

Doubles: 5 (5–0)

References

External links
 
 

1990 births
Living people
American female tennis players
Notre Dame Fighting Irish women's tennis players
Tennis people from Ohio
People from Sidney, Ohio
American sportspeople of Korean descent